Brandy Lynn Clark (born October 9, 1975) is an American country music singer-songwriter. Her songs have been recorded by Sheryl Crow, Miranda Lambert, the Band Perry, Reba McEntire, LeAnn Rimes, Billy Currington, Darius Rucker, and Kacey Musgraves. She was nominated for Best New Artist at the 2015 Grammy Awards.

Early life
Brandy Clark was born in Morton, Washington, a logging town of 900 people in the shadow of Mount Rainier. As a child in the 1980s she was influenced by the country-pop and traditional country music artists she heard her parents and grandmother play, like Barbara Mandrell, Ronnie Milsap, Merle Haggard and Loretta Lynn. Clark cites the Patsy Cline movie "Sweet Dreams" as one of her biggest early influences.

Clark began playing guitar at nine years old and sang in school musicals, also writing songs. She obtained a basketball scholarship at Central Washington University, but later moved back home, obtaining an associate degree from a community college. Still a teenager, she joined the music business program at Belmont University, and moved to Nashville in 1998. 
At Belmont she took guitar lessons again and joined a band with her mother and a friend. She studied commercial music and was chosen to perform in the school's "Best of the Best Showcase". Upon graduation, Clark got a job with Leadership Music which led to her eventual publishing deal.

Music career
In 2011 "Mama's Broken Heart", written by Clark with Shane McAnally (her frequent collaborator) and Kacey Musgraves, appeared on Miranda Lambert's album Four the Record. It was released on January 14, 2013, as the fourth single reaching No. 2 on both the Billboard Hot Country Songs and Country Airplay charts. Clark's biggest success to date was as the co-writer along with McAnally and Trevor Rosen when she celebrated a No.1 song ASCAP Party at an industry gathering for The Band Perry's third No. 1 hit, "Better Dig Two".

As a Music Row songwriter Clark writes songs that are mostly about the seedy underbelly of country folk. They are observational pieces based on flawed characters that tell the truth on the human condition. They contain dark humor, with a blend of wit and realism, while having the artistic license to make them fictional.

In 2012 she opened shows for Grammy Award-winning artist Sheryl Crow. Brandy found an advocate in country artist Marty Stuart when on Saturday December 8, 2012 she joined him to make her Grand Ole Opry debut when she played his Grand Ole Opry Anniversary celebration and also at his Late Night Jam at Nashville's Ryman Auditorium.

At the beginning of 2013 Brandy was chosen by CMT as one of the "Women of Country", a year-long promotion featuring up and coming artists.

In December 2012, Clark digitally released a self-titled three-track EP including songs "Pray to Jesus", "Stripes" and "Take a Little Pill". The song "Stripes" was released as a single and the official video made its CMT debut on July 4, 2013. It was directed by Becky Fluke (Little Big Town, Pistol Annies) and HLN's Nancy Grace plays a cameo role.
 
As a co-writer of Miranda Lambert's "Mama's Broken Heart", on September 10, 2013 Brandy received a nomination in the Song of the Year category (presented to the songwriters) for the 47th Annual CMA Awards broadcast, held in Nashville on November 6, 2013. She was also twice nominated for Song of the Year at the 4th Annual American Country Awards which were held in Las Vegas on December 10, 2013.

2013: 12 Stories
On October 22, 2013 Clark released her debut album 12 Stories. Produced by Dave Brainard, it features Vince Gill on background vocals. It made its debut at No. 28 on the Billboard Top Country Albums chart On January 6, 2014 Clark made her network CBS network TV debut on The Late Show with David Letterman, performing the lead single "Stripes". In 2014, Clark opened for Jennifer Nettles on her "That Girl" tour.

2016present: Big Day in a Small Town and Your Life Is a Record
On June 10, 2016 Clark released her second album Big Day in a Small Town, which was produced by Jay Joyce. Lead single "Girl Next Door" became her only chart entry to date, reaching No. 39 on Country Airplay.

Clark announced a new album in 2020 titled Your Life Is a Record. Also produced by Joyce, the album is led off by the single "Who You Thought I Was".

Critical reception
Clark's song "Stripes" received favorable reviews from critics. Ben Foster of Country Universe praised the track:
"As the first radio bid from an exceptionally talented singer-songwriter, "Stripes" does not disappoint. It's an ambitious, energetic debut single that makes the prospect of a full-length Brandy Clark album even more enticing." Foster rated the song an A.

Music roots publication Engine 145 described her as "one of the most talented songwriters on Music Row, and she proves she is as talented a performer as she is a writer." 12 Stories received a 4.5-out-of-5 rating.

Americana and Roots music blog Twang Nation placed 12 Stories at the top spot of its best of 2013 "Cream of the Crop".

NPR music critic Ann Powers named the album her favorite of 2013. Powers noted that others share her sentiments, writing, "the top honor on many critics' lists is going to Clark, a storyteller of the highest caliber."

The Los Angeles Times wrote that Clark's 2017 release Live from Los Angeles is "smart to the core."

Your Life Is a Record has been described as "the best-sounding album that she’s released."

Personal life
Clark identifies as lesbian.

Songwriting credits

Discography

Studio albums

Live albums

Singles

Other charted songs

Music videos

Awards and nominations

References

External links
 
 

American women country singers
American country singer-songwriters
Living people
1975 births
American lesbian musicians
LGBT people from Washington (state)
American LGBT singers
American LGBT songwriters
People from Morton, Washington
Singer-songwriters from Washington (state)
Writers from Washington (state)
Lesbian singers
Lesbian songwriters
21st-century American women singers
21st-century American singers
Warner Records artists
Country musicians from Washington (state)
20th-century American LGBT people
21st-century American LGBT people
American lesbian writers